Banducci is a surname. Notable people with this surname include:

 Bruno Banducci (1921 – 1985), Italo-American football offensive lineman 
 Enrico Banducci (1922 – 2007), American impresario
 Michael Banducci, American professional poker player 
 Susan Banducci (born 1966), American political scientist and academic

Italian-language surnames